Marovo Lagoon is the largest saltwater lagoons in the world. It is part of the Solomon Islands. It encompasses  and is protected by a double barrier reef system. Marovo Lagoon is identified as an area with high biodiversity and conservation values. 

Reef sites at the edge of the lagoon were surveyed in 2014.  The sites with the highest Live Coral Cover (LCC) in the Western Province and second highest in the Solomons were on the exposed side of the fringing reef near Marovo Lagoon measuring an average of 49% LCC. The exposed side of the fringing reef of Marovo Lagoon had an average of 38% LCC. The sites with the lowest live coral cover were found near Munda with an average of 18% LCC.

The word "Marovo" is derived from the name of the "Marovo Island" located in the central of the Lagoon.

The Marovo Lagoon World Heritage Area is located in the Marovo Lagoon. Sightings of Indo-Pacific bottlenose dolphin (Tursiops aduncus) have been confirmed in the lagoon.

There are many islands in the lagoon, some of which are inhabited. The people speak the Marovo language and live mainly by subsistence agriculture and are skilled at fishing. The men from Marovo Lagoon are known to be skilled carvers, creating and designing beautiful wooded carvings made from ebony, hardwood and kerosene wood.

The lagoon is a popular destination for diving and is a tourism hub for travelers from Australia, New Zealand, Europe and the United States.

You can travel to the Lagoon from the capital city of Solomon Islands, Honiara by 1 hour on a twin otter plane or 10 hours on a weekly ferry.

References 

Bodies of water of the Solomon Islands
Lagoons of Oceania